The West Qinling Tunnel is in the middle of the Lanzhou–Chongqing railway, crossing the Qinling. It is a 28236 metre dual-bore railway tunnel in Wudu District, Longnan City, Gansu, north-west China. It is the second longest railway tunnel in China, slightly shorter than the New Guanjiao Tunnel. The construction started on August, 2008, and went on for a duration of about five months and five years using both Tunnel boring machines (TBM) and drill and blast methods.

References

Railway tunnels in China
Transport in Gansu
Buildings and structures in Gansu
Tunnels completed in 2016